The Three Brothers is a building complex consisting of three houses, situated in Riga, Latvia. The houses together form the oldest complex of dwelling houses in Riga. Each house represents various periods of development of dwelling house construction.

The building at 17 Maza Pils Street is the oldest, dating from the late 15th century. The exterior of the building is characterised by crow-stepped gables, Gothic decorations and a few early Renaissance details. Originally the building consisted internally of one large room and an attic used for storage. The house was restored in 1955–57 by architect Pēteris Saulītis. 

The neighbouring house, 19 Maza Pils Street, has an exterior dating from 1646, with a stone portal added in 1746. The style of the building shows influences from Dutch Mannerism.

The last house of the three, located in 21 Maza Pils Street, is a narrow Baroque building which gained its present look probably during the late 17th century.

The Three Brothers complex today houses the State Inspection for Heritage Protection and the Latvian Museum of Architecture.

On April 1, 2020, the European Commission awarded Three Brothers the European Heritage Label.

Location 

The Three brothers are located in the center of Vecrīga, very close by central Dome Square and nearby Saeima. The buildings are at the addresses 17, 19 and 21 Maza Pils Street.

References

External links

Buildings and structures in Riga
Three Brothers
Gothic architecture in Latvia
Houses completed in 1646
1646 establishments in Sweden